Dampierre-Saint-Nicolas is a commune in the Seine-Maritime department in the Normandy region in northern France.

Geography

Population

Places of interest
 The church of St.Pierre & St.Paul, dating from the thirteenth century.
 Remains of a 19th-century chateau.
 A seventeenth-century manorhouse.

See also
Communes of the Seine-Maritime department

References

External links

Official commune website 

Communes of Seine-Maritime